Matthew Nicholas Hales (born 17 January 1972) is an English singer, songwriter, musician and record producer who has been performing professionally under the name Aqualung since the early 2000s. Aqualung is best known in the UK for his song "Strange and Beautiful", which was featured on a television advertisement for the new Volkswagen Beetle during the summer of 2002 and went on to become a Top 10 hit in the UK Singles Chart later that year. In the United States, Aqualung is also known for the song "Brighter Than Sunshine", which had considerable airplay and was used in the film A Lot Like Love and various television spots. Hales has released seven albums as Aqualung. The most recent, Dead Letters, appeared in 2022.

As a songwriter and record producer, Hales has collaborated with Lianne La Havas, Bat for Lashes, Tom Chaplin, Mika, Daniel Wilson, Kina Grannis, Andreya Triana, The Fray, Kwabs, Jason Mraz, Reignwolf, Sara Bareilles, Jacob Banks, Paloma Faith, Disclosure, Alex Clare, Mansionair, Mikky Ekko, For King & Country and many others.

Hales' work has earned him various awards and nominations, including two Grammy and three Ivor Novello nominations.

Life and career

Early life
Hales grew up in Southampton, where his parents ran an independent record shop. He aspired to be a musician from an early age, writing songs using the family piano when he was just 4 years old. When he was 16, Hales was awarded a scholarship to study music composition at Winchester College. Within a year, he wrote his first symphony titled "Life Cycle", and formed his first band, which carried several different names during its lifespan. In the spring of 1990, the band (known at the time as Mecano Pig) produced their debut self-titled album, but broke up soon afterwards. That same year, Hales moved to London to study music at City University, and in 1992 formed a new band with his brother Ben called Gravel Monsters.

RUTH / the 45s
Gravel Monsters became a quartet that featured Matt & Ben Hales, Matt Vincent-Brown, and Stephen Cousins. The band's name was changed to RUTH in 1992, and although it enjoyed a minor hit in 1997 ("I Don't Know") which earned them a loyal fan base, the indie rock quartet failed to find commercial success in their seven years together. Arc Records released RUTH's debut album Harrison in 1999. After the band parted ways with Arc Records in the Summer of 2000, they renamed themselves the 45s and signed a short-term contract with Mercury Records (part of the Universal Music Group). Despite releasing two well-received singles, the label declined to renew the band's contract in March 2002, leading the band to split up. It was at this moment that Matt Hales began to concentrate on a solo project that he would call Aqualung. In 2003 a double CD "Donut (A Collection Of Songs For Fellow Appreciators Of RUTH)" was compiled by the bands's former guitarist Ben Hales and independently released on the Vanity Press label. It featured re-mastered studio, demo and live tracks on one CD and three promo videos on a second CD.

Aqualung

Almost immediately after the 45s split, Aqualung's debut single "Strange and Beautiful (I'll Put a Spell on You)" gained popularity when it was used as the soundtrack on a television commercial for the new Volkswagen Beetle. It was released as a single on B-Unique Records in September 2002, and reached No. 7 on the UK Singles Chart. Later that month, B-Unique released the eponymous debut album Aqualung, which according to the sleeve notes was recorded entirely in Hales' hallway. It peaked at No. 15 on the UK Albums Chart, and achieved Gold status before year's end. The album's second single "Good Times Gonna Come" was released on 2 December 2002. It was featured on the British television show Skins, and reached No. 71 on the UK Singles Chart. Several singles followed into the next year, as did Aqualung's second album Still Life, which spawned the single "Brighter Than Sunshine". The song attracted the attention of film and television music supervisors in both Europe and North America, and was featured in the television show CSI: Crime Scene Investigation and the motion picture A Lot Like Love. "Brighter Than Sunshine" enjoyed Top 40 airplay success in the United States, leading Aqualung to a worldwide recording contract with Columbia Records in 2005, and the US release of Strange and Beautiful, a compilation of tracks from his first two UK albums. It reached No. 3 on the Billboard Top Heatseekers chart, eventually selling more than 250,000 copies in the US. Throughout the mid and late 2000s, Aqualung's music was used in television shows such as Grey's Anatomy, The O.C., CSI: Miami, Gossip Girl, Cold Case, Scrubs, One Tree Hill, Eli Stone, and Brothers and Sisters.

Hales and his touring band spent the next two years performing throughout North America, participating in the Hotel Cafe Tour, which also featured Cary Brothers, Meiko, Greg Laswell, Tom McRae, Joe Purdy, and Jim Bianco. While on the road, Hales would routinely switch up the Aqualung show with different musicians, settings, and approaches. The diverse elements he explored during these tours (including the use of an echo device called the Memory Man) subsequently drove the creative process behind what would become Aqualung's next album, Memory Man. It was released in March 2007, and the liner notes credit Hales with playing the following instruments: piano, Fender Rhodes, glockenspiel, electric guitar, Stairwell Drums, harmonium, Moog bass and vocoder. Hales completed his first UK tour since his debut album was released, and concluded the run at the newly re-opened Tabernacle, Notting Hill.

2008 brought the release of Words and Music, Hales' first album for Verve Forecast Records. It featured acoustic versions of two songs from his debut album Aqualung, as well as new songs written in a similar style. In 2010, Hales moved to Los Angeles, to begin the production of his sixth studio album titled Magnetic North. In reference to the album on his Facebook page, Hales said, "It's hard to describe. It's like 12 kids who you would never guess were in the same family until you hear them speaking." The album's first single "Fingertip" was released on 2 March 2010, and reviews of Magnetic North make reference to the indication of Los Angeles' influence on Hales as a writer, with songs containing words like "California", "Sundowning", and "Hummingbird", which were not used prior to his moving Stateside. In 2013, Hales announced on his Facebook page that he had begun work on a new Aqualung album. Also in 2013, Aqualung is featured on the song "Surrounded" on the album A Song Across Wires by EDM artist BT.

Songwriter and producer
As early as 2004, Hales began collaborating with other artists as a songwriter and producer. He co-wrote "UR" by Tiësto which featured his lead vocal, and was released as a single and featured on the album Just Be. He worked with Leona Lewis on her album Echo in 2009, and in 2010 he co-wrote songs appearing on albums by Brooke Fraser, Christophe Willem, and Boyzone.

After co-writing and producing the song "Pick Up Your Tricks" with Australian pop rock band Amy Meredith in 2011, Hales wrote and produced "Cold" which featured himself and Lucy Schwartz and appeared on The Twilight Saga: Breaking Dawn – Part 1 soundtrack, which sold more than 500,000 copies in the United States.

2012 proved to be the breakout year for Hales in the recording studio. He co-wrote and produced Is Your Love Big Enough? by British singer/songwriter Lianne La Havas. It debuted at No. 4 on the UK Albums Chart, was named iTunes UK album of the year, and was nominated at the 2012 Barclaycard Mercury Prize. In addition to this, Hales co-wrote "Everything Is Sound" on Jason Mraz's Grammy nominated album Love Is a Four Letter Word, and worked with Paloma Faith on the single "Just Be" from her album Fall to Grace. He also co-wrote and produced Diane Birch's single "Unfucked", and the single "Same Heart (feat. Tom Chaplin)" by Laura Jansen. Hales has recently spent time in the studio collaborating with Christina Perri, The Fray, Sara Bareilles, Birdie, Alex Clare, Katharine McPhee, Ginny Blackmore, Kina Grannis, Matt Nathanson, among others.

The 2022 release of the Dead Letters studio album followed a move from Los Angeles back to the United Kingdom, where Hales was reunited with his childhood piano.

Discography

Aqualung

Studio albums

Compilation albums

Extended plays

Singles

DVDs

Other releases/promos

RUTH

Selected songwriting discography

Selected production discography

References

External links

 
 
 

English male singers
English songwriters
1972 births
Living people
Columbia Records artists
21st-century English singers
21st-century British male singers
British male songwriters